The Twin Star Rocket was a passenger train operated by the Chicago, Rock Island and Pacific Railroad. Introduced on January 14, 1945, it was the only new streamlined train permitted to enter service in World War II by the U.S. government. The name of the new streamlined train was derived from its terminal states—Texas being known as the Lone Star State and Minnesota as the North Star State. Additionally, the name references Minneapolis being one of the Twin Cities and Houston's aerospace industry and culture.

Services

The Rock Island assigned the two Rocket train sets from the Kansas City–Minneapolis Rocket, and one train set from the Kansas City–Dallas Texas Rocket was transferred to the new Twin Star Rocket. The other Texas Rocket train set then began operating a daily round trip Rocket service between Oklahoma City and Kansas City. Another of the three-car Rocket trains operated an Oklahoma City–Dallas round trip daily.

Sleeping cars
The new Twin Star Rocket operated the Minneapolis–Kansas City segment of the trip in daylight hours in both directions, so no sleeping cars were initially carried between those cities. At Kansas City the southbound Twin Star Rocket added a lightweight 8-section, 5-double bedroom sleeping car for the overnight run to Houston. The northbound train carried another 8-section, 5-double bedroom sleeping car between Houston and Kansas City. The two lightweight streamlined sleeping cars originally assigned to the Twin Star Rocket were Forest Canyon and Thompson Canyon, two cars originally assigned to the Rocky Mountain Rocket as Kansas City–Denver cars.  The Twin Star Rocket served Saint Paul Union Depot, Albert Lea, Des Moines, Kansas City, Topeka, Wichita, El Reno, Fort Worth and Dallas en route to Houston from Minneapolis. By 1957 the sections were replaced by modern roomettes.

Locomotives
The Rock Island powered these three streamlined consists with EMD E6A units taken from other schedules.

Baggage and dining cars
Each train set was assigned a heavyweight baggage-30-foot Railway Post Office cars, streamlined dining cars came from the Golden State and were known as the Cactus series as each was named for a cactus—#422 Yucca; #423 Sahuaro; and #424 Ocotillo. The Twin Star Rockets were fully streamlined in 1948.

References

Passenger trains of the Chicago, Rock Island and Pacific Railroad
Named passenger trains of the United States
Night trains of the United States
Railway services introduced in 1945
Railway services discontinued in 1967